Carrie Buday (née Lightbound) (born August 8, 1979 in Laval, Quebec) is a Canadian sprint kayaker who competed in the early to mid-2000s. Competing in two Summer Olympics, she earned her best finish of eighth in the K-4 500 m event at Athens in 2004.

Carrie currently is a special needs teacher in Mississauga at st.rose of Lima catholic elementary school.

References
Sports-Reference.com profile

1979 births
Anglophone Quebec people
Canadian female canoeists
Canoeists at the 2000 Summer Olympics
Canoeists at the 2004 Summer Olympics
Living people
Olympic canoeists of Canada
Sportspeople from Laval, Quebec